Faia Younan (born 20 June 1992) is an Assyrian-Syrian singer, considered the first Middle Eastern artist ever to crowdfund her debut.

Early life 
Younan was born on 20 June 1992 to an Assyrian Christian family in the city of Al-Malikiyah, Syria, and grew up in the city of Aleppo. At the age of eleven she moved to Sweden with her family and settled there until she moved to Scotland in 2010 to study Social Sciences; Economics and Business in the Glasgow University. After graduating she moved back to Sweden. Faia identifies as an Arab, with Arabic also being her mother tongue, and she has stated that it feels like home when visiting the Arab world.  

Younan was a volunteer in the Swedish Red Cross and sang in local events.

Career 
In October 2014, inspired by the political atmosphere in her native Syria and its neighboring Arab countries which she described as "loaded and hopeless", Younan published a video that she created with her sister Rihan, titled "To Our Countries". The video, which addresses the political reality of the Middle East and features Younan's rendition of several songs by Lebanese diva Fairuz, went viral on YouTube and received exceptional attention, encouraging Younan to continue pursuing a career in music. The success of the video had the biggest impact on her decision on turning singing from merely a hobby to a full-time commitment.

After a successful crowd funding campaign, Younan released her debut single "Ohebbou Yadayka" (I Love Your Hands) followed by two other singles. "Ohebbou Yadayka" crowd funding campaign got Younan, in association with her manager Houssam Abdul Khalek, to Guinness World Records as the first middle eastern artist to crowd fund her debut song. This makes Younan the first female artist from the Arab World to enter the Guinness World Records Book. "A Sea Between Us" was Faia's debut album and it contains 9 songs.

She was featured on the single "Busted and Blue" (Faia Younan Special)" from virtual band Gorillaz' which appears on two versions of their Humanz album.

In March 2019, Younan started releasing her second album ”Tales of the heart” digitally. The album contains 8 songs, referred to as tales, since each song is unique in musical genre and topic.

In both of her albums, Younan worked with Houssam Abdul Khalek as a music producer and creative director and Rayan Habre as a music arranger.

Discography

Albums

Singles

References

External links 

 
 
 
 

1992 births
Living people
Singers who perform in Classical Arabic
People from Aleppo
21st-century Syrian women singers
Alumni of the University of Glasgow
Naturalized citizens of Sweden
Syrian women activists
Assyrian/Syriac Syrians